Eupithecia tricerata is a moth in the family Geometridae. It is found in Israel, Jordan and Saudi Arabia.

Subspecies
Eupithecia tricerata tricerata
Eupithecia tricerata sperlichi Hausmann, 1991 (Jordan)

References

Moths described in 1990
tricerata
Moths of Asia